Portugal was represented by Duarte Mendes, with the song "Madrugada", at the 1975 Eurovision Song Contest, which took place on 22 March in Stockholm. "Madrugada" was chosen as the Portuguese entry at the Grande Prémio TV da Canção Portuguesa on 15 February.

Before Eurovision

Festival da Canção 1975
The Grande Prémio TV da Canção Portuguesa 1975 was the first that did not pass the sieve of the censorship or Commission of Preliminary Examination, as the regime preferred to designate the censors in the last years of the dictatorship. In 1975 there was a highly revolutionary climate in Portugal, it was the time of Processo Revolucionário Em Curso (PREC) (Ongoing Revolutionary Process), for this reason the high political content of the 10 songs in the competition. Duarte Mendes, the winner, was himself a captain of April.

This edition was held at the Teatro Maria Matos in Lisbon, hosted by Maria Elisa Domingues and José Nuno Martins. Ten songs took part in the final.

For the first time, no public contest for the free submission of songs was held. Instead, the Radio and Television of Portugal, in view of the scarcity of time to open the contest to all composers and also because of the concern to bring some quality to the event (this was the argument used), chose to invite 14 composers (those who had stood out the most in the last works performed, of these 14 composers 10 accepted to compete, being responsible for the choice of the respective authors of the lyrics and the interpreters. Zeca Afonso and Adriano Correia de Oliveira refused the invitation because they were in Angola, while Fernando Tordo and José Calvário claimed have nothing ready to compete.

The voting was the responsibility of the authors and composers in the contest who had to award between 1-5 points to the songs other than their own. Thus, the authors of the lyrics of the 10 songs took a vote and the composers another and had the right of making a 1-minute declaration of vote.

The transmission of this Festival was also different, so the presentation of the 10 songs to the general public was delayed on 14 February at 1 pm on RTP1 and at 9 pm on RTP2 (at the time, not everyone had access to this channel). The next day, Saturday, the recording of the songs went on again and the voting, live, revealed the will of the authors and composers.

At Eurovision 
On the night of the final Mendes performed 16th in the running order, following Finland and preceding Spain. This year a new scoring system was implemented. Each country would be represented by a jury of 11 members, at least half of whom had to be under the age of 26. Each jury member had to award every song a mark of between 1 and 5 points, but could not vote for their own nation's entry. The votes were cast immediately after the song was performed and collected by the adjudicator straight away. After the last song was performed, the jury secretary added up all the votes cast and awarded 12 points to the song with the highest score, 10 to the second highest score, then 8 to the third, 7 to the fourth, 6 to the fifth and so forth down to 1 point for the song ranked 10th, a points system that remains in use today.

At the close of the voting the song had received 16 points, coming 16th in the field of 19 competing countries. The orchestra during the Portuguese entry was conducted by Pedro Osório.

Voting

References 

1975
Countries in the Eurovision Song Contest 1975
Eurovision